The Billboard Millennium Award is a prestigious award from the Billboard Music Awards that originated in 2011 to recognize singers of great impact and influence in the music industry. The recipient of the award also performs during the ceremony. Also, the Billboard Millennium Awards are not awarded every year.

Recipients

See also
Billboard Spotlight Award
Brit Award for Outstanding Contribution to Music
Michael Jackson Video Vanguard Award
Grammy Lifetime Achievement Award

References

Millennium
Awards established in 2011